The 2022 Brisbane Broncos season was the 35th in the club's history. Coached by Kevin Walters and captained by Adam Reynolds, they competed in the NRL's 2022 Telstra Premiership. After spending much of the season in the top 8, the Broncos crumbled, losing five of their last games and finishing the season in 9th position.

Player movements
Source:

Gains
Kurt Capewell from Penrith Panthers
Ryan James from Canterbury Bankstown Bulldogs
Corey Jensen from North Queensland Cowboys
Brenko Lee from Melbourne Storm
Jordan Pereira from St. George Illawarra Dragons
Adam Reynolds from South Sydney Rabbitohs
Billy Walters from Wests Tigers

Losses
Jesse Arthars to New Zealand Warriors
John Asiata to Leigh Centurions
Ethan Bullemor to Manly Warringah Sea Eagles
Xavier Coates to Melbourne Storm
Brodie Croft to Salford Red Devils
Alex Glenn to Retired
Danny Levi to Huddersfield Giants
Anthony Milford to Newcastle Knights
Tevita Pangai Junior to Penrith Panthers
Isaiah Tass to South Sydney Rabbitohs

Fixtures

Pre-season

Regular season

References

Brisbane Broncos seasons
Brisbane Broncos season
2022 NRL Women's season